The University of Detroit Mercy School of Law is the law school of the University of Detroit Mercy and is located in Downtown Detroit, Michigan across from the Renaissance Center. Founded in 1912, Detroit Mercy Law is a private Roman Catholic law school and has been ABA-accredited since 1933. The Law School has an annual enrollment of about 536 students and currently has 88 faculty members (28 full-time, 60 adjunct).

Detroit Mercy Law offers full-time, part-time and extended part-time JD programs as well as a number of dual degrees, including a J.D./M.B.A. and Dual J.D. program. In 2009, the Law School admitted about 45 percent of its 1,707 full-time applicants and about 40 percent of its 219 part-time applicants. The Law School's JD 2016 entering class had a median LSAT of 151 and a median GPA of 3.15 and a median LSAT of 155 and a median GPA of 3.312 for Dual JD students. In January 2012, Detroit Mercy Law purchased a 6,000 sq. ft. facility across the street from its campus which will house the numerous clinics operated by the school.

History 
Detroit Mercy Law was founded as the University of Detroit Law School in 1912 (the University of Detroit merged with Mercy College of Detroit in 1990 to become the University of Detroit Mercy). It is the oldest private law school in Michigan and it shares the Jesuit and Mercy tradition of value oriented education. The historic Renaissance-style campus is located between East Jefferson Avenue and East Larned Street just north of I-375 and is within a short walking distance to the Renaissance Center and numerous state and federal government buildings, including the Third Judicial Circuit Court (Wayne County) and the Federal District Court for the Eastern District of Michigan among others.

Employment 
88% of the Class of 2020 was employed in a full-time, long-term, bar passage-required or JD advantage position as of March 15, 2021, as stated in the ABA-required disclosures on the Detroit Mercy Law website. 91% of the graduating class of 2020 had secured legal positions.

Costs
Tuition and fees at University of Detroit Mercy School of Law for the 2021-22 academic year is $44,790 per year (for 30 credits).

Academics, publications, and moot court

Detroit Mercy Law maintains a core first-year curriculum, consisting of Contracts, Civil Procedure, Property, Torts, Criminal Law, Introduction to Legal Research and Communication and Applied Legal Theory and Analysis (ALTA). Other required courses include Constitutional Law, Evidence, Federal Income Taxation, and Professional Responsibility.

The School's clinical program was founded as the Urban Law Clinic in 1965, and was among the earliest clinics in the nation. Since that time, the program has received numerous awards including the ABA Louis M. Brown Award for Legal Access with Meritorious Recognition in 2012 and the ABA Law Student Division's Judy M. Weightman Memorial Public Interest Award in 2006. Students attend weekly classes that focus on the relevant skills and substantive law and all clinics provide for meaningful guided reflection.

The Law School's main academic publication is the University of Detroit Mercy Law Review, having contributed to the legal scholarship of the state of Michigan and the nation since 1916. This student-led organization publishes four issues a year and hosts an annual symposium in the spring to discuss topics of developing legal significance and scholarly debate. Within the last ten years, Detroit Mercy Law Review articles have been cited in the opinions of the United States Supreme Court, United States Circuit Courts of Appeals, and many state supreme courts (including Michigan).

The School of Law hosts both an internal trial and appellate moot court competition annually known as the G. Mennen Williams Moot Court Competition. The school's Moot Court Team competes nationally and has had  success both at the regional and national level: it was the National Champion for the 2009 National Invitational Appellate Moot Court Competition and the 2008 McGee Civil Rights National Moot Court Competition.

Notable alumni 
Graduates of Detroit Mercy Law include over half of Michigan state prosecutors as well as sitting judges on the U.S. Courts of Appeals, U.S. District Courts, the Michigan Supreme Court, and the Michigan Court of Appeals. The School of Law has also graduated over 120 current judges on various district, municipal and probate courts in Michigan. Alumni have also held major elective offices in the state and local governments of Michigan, including three former mayors of the City of Detroit, two former Michigan Attorneys General, and a host of other executive positions.

Notable judges from Detroit Mercy Law:
 Thomas P. Thornton (Class of 1926) - United States District Court for the Eastern District of Michigan
 James L. Ryan (Class of 1957) - United States Court of Appeals for the Sixth Circuit
 Thomas A. Carlson (Class of 1975) - United States District Court for the Eastern District of Michigan
 Patrick J. Duggan (Class of 1958) - United States District Court for the Eastern District of Michigan
 Barbara K. Hackett (Class of 1950) - United States District Court for the Eastern District of Michigan
 Paul J. Komives (Class of 1958) - United States District Court for the Eastern District of Michigan
 Mona K. Majzoub (Class of 1976) - United States District Court for the Eastern District of Michigan
 Paul Maloney (Class of 1975) - United States District Court for the Western District of Michigan
 Maura D. Corrigan (Class of 1973) - Michigan Supreme Court (retired 2011)
 Michael F. Cavanagh (Class of 1966) - Michigan Supreme Court
 Brian K. Zahra (Class of 1987) - Michigan Supreme Court
 Alice Robie Resnick (Class of 1964) - Ohio Supreme Court (resigned 2007)
 Latrice A. Westbrooks (Class of 1997) - Mississippi Court of Appeals
 Shalina D. Kumar (Class of 1996) - United States District Court for the Eastern District of Michigan
 Kristina Robinson Garrett (Class of 2010) - Michigan Court of Appeals
 Kirstin Frank Kelly (Class of 1986) - Michigan Court of Appeals
 Christopher M. Murray - Michigan Court of Appeals
 Michael J. Riordan - Michigan Court of Appeals
 Kathleen Jansen (Class of 1982) - Michigan Court of Appeals
 James Robert Redford (Class of 1985) - Michigan Court of Appeals
Notable legislators from Detroit Mercy Law:

 Kyra Harris Bolden (Class of 2014) - Michigan State Representative
 Vanessa Guerra (Class of 2016) - Saginaw County Clerk (former State Representative)

Other Notable Detroit Mercy Law Alumni:

 Frank J. Kelley (Class of 1951) - 50th Attorney General of Michigan (1961-1999)
 Anne Davidow (Class of 1920) - Pioneering Female Attorney
 Henry H. Tarrant (Class of 1922) - First Known African American Graduate of the Law School
 Peter DeBoer - Head Coach of the Vegas Golden Knights
 Mikyia Aaron (Class of 2015) - Grand Valley State University Board of Trustees

Notable Professors:

 Barbara M. McQuade - Former United States Attorney for the Eastern District of Michigan (former adjunct)
 Jelani Jefferson Exum - First African American Dean of the Law School

See also
 Barbara L. McQuade
 Detroit Mercy Law clinics

References

External links
Official site
Detroit Mercy Law's Law Review's official website

School Of Law
Catholic law schools in the United States
Law schools in Michigan
Downtown Detroit
Educational institutions established in 1912
1912 establishments in Michigan